Amn or AMN may refer to:

Biology
 Alpha motor neuron (α-MNs), large lower motor neurons of the brainstem and spinal cord
 Amnionless, a gene for a protein necessary for efficient absorption of vitamin B12
 Adrenoleukodystrophy, a rare X-linked genetic disease

Media companies
 AMN (TV station), in Griffith, New South Wales, Australia
 Access Media Network, a communications media company
 Al-Masdar News, a multilingual news website
 All Media Network, a former music, movie and game database company acquired by RhythmOne

Military and politics
 Afghanistan Mission Network, a coalition network for NATO led missions in Afghanistan
 Airman, a low-grade enlisted rank in the US armed forces
 Directorate of General Security, Arabic name of former Iraqi intelligence agency
 Alianţa Moldova Noastră, a former social-liberal political party in Moldova

Other uses
 Amn (Forgotten Realms), a fictional country in Dungeons & Dragons
 Ahli Mangku Negara, a Malaysian honour
 Ainsley Maitland-Niles, a professional footballer
 Gratiot Community Airport, Alma, Michigan, US (IATA code AMN)